Mark A. Murdock (born February 20, 1952) is a Minnesota politician and former member of the Minnesota House of Representatives representing District 10B, which included portions of Becker, Otter Tail and Wadena counties in the northwestern part of the state. A Republican, he is also the owner and operator of an ACE Hardware in Perham.

Murdock was elected in 2008, running after three-term Rep. Dean Simpson opted not to seek re-election. He was re-elected in 2010. He was a member of the House's Commerce and Labor Committee and K-12 Education Policy and Oversight Committee, and also served on the Commerce and Labor Subcommittee for the Labor and Consumer Protection Division, on which he was the ranking minority party member, and the Environment Policy and Oversight Subcommittee for the Game, Fish and Forestry Division.

Murdock attended Southwest State College in Marshall, graduating with a B.A. in history and political science in 1974. He has been active in his community as a bank board and chamber of commerce member, and is a former president of the local Jaycees.

References

External links 

 Rep. Murdock Web Page
 Project Votesmart - Rep. Mark Murdock Profile
 Mark Murdock Campaign Web Site

1952 births
Living people
People from Otter Tail County, Minnesota
Republican Party members of the Minnesota House of Representatives
Politicians from Salem, Oregon
21st-century American politicians